The 2003 Italian Grand Prix (formally the Gran Premio Vodafone d'Italia 2003) was a Formula One motor race held on 14 September 2003 at the Autodromo Nazionale di Monza, Monza, Italy. It was the fourteenth race of the 2003 Formula One season and the eighty-seventh Italian Grand Prix. The 53-lap race was won by Michael Schumacher driving for Ferrari after starting from pole position. Juan Pablo Montoya finished second in a Williams car, with Rubens Barrichello third in the other Ferrari.

Report

Friday drivers 
The 3 teams in the 2003 Constructors' Championship had the right to drive a third car on Friday that were involved in additional training. These drivers did not compete in qualifying or the race.

Classification

Qualifying

Race

Notes 

Gené replaced the injured Ralf Schumacher for this race, scoring his highest ever Formula One finish and his last points.
The race was completed with the fastest ever average race speed of 247.585 km/h.
This was the shortest-duration fully completed Formula One World Championship race.

Championship standings after the race 
Bold text indicates who still has a theoretical chance of becoming World Champion.

Drivers' Championship standings

Constructors' Championship standings

Note: Only the top five positions are included for both sets of standings.

References

Italian Grand Prix
Grand Prix
Italian Grand Prix
September 2003 sports events in Europe